Jeff McInerney (born June 22, 1960) is an American professional football coach and former player who is the current defensive quality control and special teams coordinator for the New Jersey Generals of the United States Football League (USFL). He served as head football coach at Central Connecticut State University (CCSU) from 2006 to 2013, compiling a record of 48–41.

Coaching career
McInerney is an alumnus of Slippery Rock University. He began his coaching career at his alma mater as an undergraduate in 1981, followed by one season as a graduate assistant coach in 1982. McInerney subsequently served as an assistant coach at Troy University, Georgia Southern University, the University of Tulsa, the University of Nevada, Las Vegas, Oregon State University, Duke University, the University of Southern California and the University of Rhode Island.

In January 2006, McInerney was named the head coach at Central Connecticut State University located in New Britain, Connecticut, becoming the 12th football coach at the school. He held that position for eight seasons, until his resignation in November 2013. His coaching record at Central Connecticut was 48–41 (.539). He resigned his position at the end of the season, citing a desire to move on to another opportunity, adding "There are things, at 53, that I want to do".

In 2014, McInerney became the defensive line and special teams coach for Henderson State. In 2015 he served as the co-Defensive Coordinator. In 2016, McInerney became a Quality Control assistant for the Indiana Hoosiers.

In 2018, McInerney was named as the defensive line and special teams coach for the San Antonio Commanders of the Alliance of American Football.

McInerney joined the New York Guardians of the XFL in 2019.

Head coaching record

References

External links
 Central Connecticut profile

1960 births
Living people
American football linebackers
Central Connecticut Blue Devils football coaches
Duke Blue Devils football coaches
Georgia Southern Eagles football coaches
New Jersey Generals (2022) coaches
New York Guardians coaches
North Dakota State Bison football coaches
Oregon State Beavers football coaches
Rhode Island Rams football coaches
Rice Owls football coaches
San Antonio Commanders coaches
Slippery Rock football coaches
Slippery Rock football players
Southern Illinois Salukis football coaches
Troy Trojans football coaches
Tulsa Golden Hurricane football coaches
UNLV Rebels football coaches
USC Trojans football coaches
UTEP Miners football coaches
People from South Windsor, Connecticut
Sportspeople from Bethlehem, Pennsylvania
Coaches of American football from Pennsylvania
Players of American football from Pennsylvania